Taguig, officially the City of Taguig, is a 1st class highly urbanized city in Metro Manila, Philippines. According to the 2020 census, it has a population of 886,722 people. Located in the northwestern shores of Laguna de Bay, the city is known for Bonifacio Global City, one of the leading financial centers of the Philippines. Originally a fishing village during the Spanish and American colonial periods, it experienced rapid growth when former military reservations were converted by the Bases Conversion and Development Authority (BCDA) into mixed-use planned communities. Taguig became a highly urbanized city with the passage of Republic Act No. 8487 in 2004.

The city is politically subdivided into 28 barangays: Bagumbayan, Bambang, Calzada, Central Bicutan, Central Signal Village, Fort Bonifacio, Hagonoy, Ibayo Tipas, Katuparan, Ligid Tipas, Lower Bicutan, Maharlika Village, Napindan, New Lower Bicutan, North Daang Hari, North Signal Village, Palingon Tipas, Pinagsama, San Miguel, Santa Ana, South Daang Hari, South Signal Village, Tanyag, Tuktukan, Ususan, Upper Bicutan, Wawa, and Western Bicutan. The city is also divided into two legislative districts: Pateros & Taguig (which includes the Municipality of Pateros) and Taguig, for its representation in the Congress and the election of city council members.

Etymology

The original farmer-fishermen of the area, about 800 in number, were good at threshing rice after harvest. Hence they were referred to as "mga taga-giik," (Tagalog for "rice thresher") and the settlement as "pook ng mga taga-giik." Spanish friar Fray Alonso de Alvarado, together with conquistador Ruy López de Villalobos who crossed the Pasig River to reach the city's present site in 1571, found "taga-giik" difficult to pronounce. "Tagui-ig" was later shortened to its current form "Taguig".

History

Early history 
Before the Spaniards came, Taguig was a part of Namayan and Tondo ruled by Lakandula. There were also accounts that Chinese settlements were once present in the area as revealed by the recent archaeological diggings of various artifacts like cups, plates and other utensils, which bear Chinese characters. This was believed to have originated from China's Ming dynasty.

Spanish colonial era 
Taguig was one of the earliest known territories to have been Christianized when the Spaniards succeeded in subjugating mainland Luzon through the Legazpi expedition in 1571. Between the years 1582 and 1583, Taguig was part of the encomienda of Tondo headed by an alcalde mayor, Captain Vergara. It was in 1587 when Taguig was established as a separate "pueblo" (town) of the then province of Manila. Captain Juan Basi was its Kapitan from 1587 to 1588. According to records, Taguig had nine barrios then namely, Bagumbayan, Bambang, Hagonoy, Palingon, Santa Ana, Tipas, Tuktukan, Ususan, and Wawa. Records show that Tipas had once petitioned to become an independent town but was denied by the Spanish government.

During that time, Taguig was accessible via the Pasig River, which was connected to two large bodies of water, Manila Bay and Laguna de Bay. The population then was estimated to be 800 tributes. The town produced more than enough rice for consumption but had less sugar cane to mill. The men lived through fishing while women wove cotton cloth and "sawali" from bamboo strips. The people of Taguig were known to have resisted both Spanish and American colonial rule. During that early period of Spanish colonization. Don Juan Basi, "Kapitan" of Taguig from 1587 to 1588, took part in the Tondo Conspiracy, an attempt to overthrow the Spanish government which failed. Basi was exiled for two years as punishment. When the Katipunan was on its early years, many from Taguig became followers and later joined the uprising. The people of Taguig also joined the revolutionary government of General Emilio Aguinaldo on August 6, 1898.

American colonial era 
During the American occupation, they struggled against the forces of General Wheaton under the command of General Pio del Pilar. It was recorded that on February 6, 1899, Filipino forces including Taguig "revolutionarios" dislodged an American position in the hills of Taguig, now a portion of Pateros and Fort Bonifacio. They were defeated eventually by the Americans with superiority in the armaments and training. Taguig finally fell to the contingent of the First Washington Volunteer Infantry led by Col. Wholly.

The defeat of the Filipinos after two years of struggle against the American forces subsequently subjected the Philippines to another system of governance. On August 14, 1898, United States occupied the islands and established a military government with General Wesley Meritt as the First Military Governor. He exercised legislative powers until September 1, 1900. At the start of American occupation, Taguig was proclaimed as an independent municipality with the promulgation of General Order No. 4 on March 29, 1900. The town was subsequently incorporated to the newly created province of Rizal when the Philippine Commission promulgated Act. No. 137 on June 11, 1901. On October 12, 1903, Taguig, Muntinlupa and Pateros were merged by the virtue of Act. No. 942 with Pateros hosting the seat of the municipal government. The merger did not last long as a month later Muntinlupa was segregated from it and made part of Biñan when Act. No. 1008 was enacted on November 25, 1903. However it was returned to Taguig on March 22, 1905, with the promulgation Act. No. 1308. On February 29, 1908, Taguig was again declared an independent municipality through Executive Order No. 20. Eventually, Pateros separated from Taguig and both became independent municipalities of Rizal province on January 1, 1918.

It was also during the American Colonial Period that the US government acquired a  property of Taguig for military purposes. This large piece of land, which had a TCT dated 1902, was turned into a camp that became known as Fort McKinley (named after William McKinley, 25th president of the U.S.).

Japanese occupation 
When the Japanese occupied the Philippines in 1942, Fort McKinley was taken over by the Japanese Imperial Army. They occupied the military camp until the end of the war in 1945.

Post-independence era 
After the Philippines gained its political independence from the United States on July 4, 1946, the US surrendered the Republic of the Philippines all right of possession, jurisdiction, supervision and control over the Philippine territory except the use of the military bases. On May 14, 1949, Fort William McKinley was turned over to the Philippine government by virtue of the US Embassy Note No. 0570. Fort McKinley was made the permanent headquarters of the Philippine Army in 1957 and was subsequently renamed Fort Bonifacio after the Father of the Philippine Revolution against Spain, Andres Bonifacio.

The Marcos dictatorship era 
When Ferdinand Marcos placed the Philippines under martial law in 1972, Tagiuig, which contained Fort Bonifacio, became the host of two detention centers full of political prisoners - the Maximum Security Unit where  Senators Jose W. Diokno and Benigno Aquino Jr. were detained. and the Ipil Reception Center (sometimes called the Ipil Detention Center). A third facility, the Youth Rehabilitation Center (YRC), was still treated as part of Fort Bonifacio but was later turned into the Makati City Jail.  These detention centers became infamous for the numerous human rights abuses of the Marcos dictatorship, including warrantless detention and torture.

Senator Benigno Aquino Jr. and Senator Jose Diokno were Marcos' first martial law prisoners, arrested just before midnight on September 22, 1972, and at 1 AM on September 23, 1972, respectively.  They were eventually imprisoned in Fort Bonifacio at the Maximum Security Unit separate from Ipil and YRC.  They stayed there until Marcos moved them to an even higher security facility in Fort Magsaysay in Laur, Nueva Ecija on March 12, 1973.

Ipil was the largest prison facility for political prisoners during martial law. Among the prisoners held there were some of the country's leading academics, creative writers, journalists, and historians including Butch Dalisay, Ricky Lee, Bienvenido Lumbera, Jo Ann Maglipon, Ninotchka Rosca, Zeus Salazar, and William Henry Scott. After Fort Bonifacio was privatized, the area in which Ipil was located became the area near SNR and Home Depot, near 32nd Street and 8th Avenue in Bonifacio Global City.

In 1974, the name of the Taguig's political subdivisions was changed from "barrios" to "barangays" following the nationwide implementation of the Integrated Reorganization Plan (IRP) under Presidential Decree No. 557. The IRP increased Taguig's administrative divisions to 18 barangays, namely, Bagong Tanyag, Bagumbayan, Bambang, Calzada, Hagonoy, Ibayo-Tipas, Ligid-Tipas, Lower Bicutan, Maharlika, Napindan, Palingon, Signal Village, Santa Ana, Tuktukan, Upper Bicutan, Ususan, Wawa, and Western Bicutan.

On November 7, 1975, Taguig seceded from the province of Rizal to become part of the newly formed the National Capital Region through Presidential Decree No. 824.

Cityhood 

In 1998, a bill was passed in Congress pushing for the cityhood of Taguig. The resulting plebiscite in April showed that the citizens were against cityhood. A recent petition to the Supreme Court sought a recount of the plebiscite and the Supreme Court on February 19, 2004, ordered the Commission on Elections to conduct a recount. The recount showed that the residents did want the municipality of Taguig to become a city (21,105 'yes' and 19,460 'no'). Subsequently, Taguig became a city on December 8, 2004.

Contemporary history 
In 2008, the City Council created 10 new barangays, carving them out from the initial 18 barangays. Hence, in December 2008, after a successful plebiscite, the numbers of barangays in the city increased from 10 to 28 barangays. The 10 newly created barangays were Central Bicutan, New Lower Bicutan, Fort Bonifacio, Katuparan, North Signal Village, South Signal Village, South Daanghari, North Daanghari, Pinagsama, San Miguel, and Tanyag.

In 2011, during 424th foundation day, Mayor Lani Cayetano takes pride in calling the city a “ProbinSyudad” because it is the only remaining city in Metro Manila which has the amenities of a highly urbanized city, yet has the feel and relaxing atmosphere of a province plus its people exude the values and magandang asal of the probinsyano, what with its more than 10 kilometers of lakeshore, with farmers, fishermen, old churches, a historic lighthouse, and with people whose virtue of pagtutulungan is still very much alive.

A new, "state-of-the-art" 17-storey Taguig City Hall is currently being built in Barangay Ususan along Cayetano Boulevard and is expected to be completed in 2021. This will replace the current city hall in Barangay Tuktukan that was built in 1959 and was renovated thrice.

Geography

Taguig is located on the northwestern shores of Laguna de Bay, the largest lake in the Philippines. Taguig River, a tributary of the Pasig River, runs through the northern half of the city, while the Napindan River, another tributary of Pasig, forms the natural border between Taguig in Pasig. A relatively small area of the city called Ibayo Napindan is located north of the river, adjoining the disputed territories between Pasig, Taguig and Taytay in Rizal Province. The city has an area of 53.67 square kilometers.

Barangays

Taguig is politically subdivided into 28 barangays. In December 2008, ten new barangays were created in the city after a successful plebiscite by virtue of City Ordinance Nos. 24–27, 57–61, 67–69, and 78, Series of 2008.

Parts of Hagonoy became under the jurisdiction of a new barangay San Miguel
Lower Bicutan was divided into two, the other one to be known as Barangay New Lower Bicutan

Signal Village was divided into four barangays, Central Signal Village (originating barangay), Katuparan, North Signal Village, and South Signal Village.
Bagong Tanyag was divided into three barangays, North Daang Hari, South Daang Hari, and Tanyag proper (originating barangay)
Parts of Upper Bicutan became under the jurisdiction of a new barangay Central Bicutan
Western Bicutan was divided into three barangays, Fort Bonifacio, Pinagsama and Western Bicutan (originating barangay).

Climate
The climate of Taguig is characterized by two types of season: dry season from November to April, and wet season from May to October. Rainfall is less evenly distributed.

Territorial disputes

Taguig, Makati and Pateros have fought over the jurisdiction of Fort Bonifacio and nearby places. In 2003, the Pasig Regional Trial Court (RTC) ruled that Fort Bonifacio and Pinagsama Village belongs to Taguig. In 2011, the Pasig RTC also ruled that the "embo" barangays (Cembo, South Cembo, East Rembo, West Rembo, Comembo, Pembo), as well as Rizal and Pitogo, are part of Taguig since they were formerly part of the military reservation. Pateros also claims the "embo" barangays, parts of Taguig and Fort Bonifacio, but the municipality's petition were dismissed by the Supreme Court. Meanwhile, the Court of Appeals stopped Taguig from exercising jurisdiction in the said areas in 2013. On 2017, the Court of Appeals upheld its final decision that Fort Bonifacio belongs to Taguig.

Taguig is also involved in a dispute between Pasig and Taytay, Rizal over a large area which covers Ibayo Napindan, Pinagbuhatan, and Lupang Arendra.

Demographics

According to the 2020 census, the population of the city was 886,722, making it the seventh most populous city in the Philippines, and the fourth most populous city in Luzon.

Housing

Fort Bonifacio Tenement

Economy 

Taguig's center of trade and commerce are at the Bonifacio Global City, Uptown district, McKinley Hills and McKinley West, and Arca South. The Philippine Stock Exchange main office and trading floor is located in Taguig.

Government

Local government
Like other cities in the Philippines, Taguig is governed by a mayor and vice mayor who are elected to three-year terms. The mayor is the executive head and leads the city's departments in executing the city ordinances and improving public services. The city mayor is restricted to three consecutive terms, totaling nine years, although a mayor can be elected again after an interruption of one term. The vice mayor heads a legislative council consisting of 18 members: 8 councilors from the First District, 8 councilors from the Second District, the president of the Sangguniang Kabataan (Youth Council) Federation, representing the youth sector, and the president of the Association of Barangay Chairmen (ABC) as barangay sectoral representative. The council is in charge of creating the city's policies in the form of Ordinances and Resolutions.

City officials
The current mayor for the 2022-2025 term is Lani Cayetano. Arvin Alit, a former councilor is the city's incumbent vice mayor. The current district representatives of the city are the former vice mayor Ricardo "Ading" Cruz, Jr., representing the 1st District and former councilor Amparo Maria "Pammy" Zamora, representing the 2nd District.

Past mayors of Taguig

Education

Taguig City is home to several prestigious international schools which provide international education to Metro Manila residents, such as the British School Manila, Everest Academy Manila, International School Manila, and Manila Japanese School, which are all located in the University Parkway of Bonifacio Global City. The Chinese International School Manila, Enderun Colleges, and Korean International School Philippines are in the nearby area of McKinley Hill, while The Beacon School is located along the nearby Chino Roces Avenue.

The Taguig City University is the prime university run and managed by the city. Established in 2004 through Ordinance No. 29, Series of 2004 (enacted September 6, 2004, Municipal Government of Taguig. The university main campus is located inside the Taguig City Hall of Justice Compound.

Other schools in Fort Bonifacio are the STI College Global City, Global City Innovative College, Leaders International Christian School of Manila (Christian-based curriculum), Victory Leadership Institute, and MGC-New Life Christian Academy.

Two of the top state universities are also in Taguig—the Polytechnic University of the Philippines, and the Technological University of the Philippines. Both universities are located within the city in Central Bicutan and Western Bicutan.

The University of Santo Tomas in 2015 offered an offsite Masters in Business Administration (MBA) class of its Graduate School at the PCCI Building at McKinley Hills.

In 2016, the University of the Philippines inaugurated its campus in Bonifacio Global City for its law programs. Following that year
in 2017, the De La Salle University College of Law opened its Rufino Campus at Bonifacio Global City's University Parkway Drive.

Enderun Colleges, an affiliate of Les Roches International School of Hotel Management-Switzerland is an undergraduate college and management school in the Philippines that offers a full range of bachelor's degree and non-degree courses in the fields of international hospitality management and business administration. Likewise, The Meridian International College or MINT, a tertiary educational institution of arts, business and technology are both located in McKinley Hill, Barangay Pinagsama, Taguig City.

Taguig City University, the city's local state university located in Central Bicutan started operations in November 2006.

The Technical Education and Skills Development Authority (TESDA) was established through the enactment of "Technical Education and Skills Development Act of 1994", which was signed into law by President Fidel V. Ramos. This Act aims to encourage the full participation of and mobilize the industry, labor, local government units, and technical-vocational institutions in the skills development of the country's human resource. The TESDA complex and facilities are located at the East Service Road of the South Luzon Expressway in Taguig.

The Philippine Public Safety College in Fort Bonifacio is an educational institution offering undergraduate and graduate programs for the training, human resource development, and continuing education of police, fire and jail personnel.

Taguig has two Islamic educational institutions located in Maharlika Village—the Maharlika Bandara-Inged Integrated School and the Maharlika Village Islamic Madrasa.

Other notable schools in Taguig include the city's Science High Schools Taguig Science High School in Barangay San Miguel, Senator Renato "Compañero" Cayetano Memorial Science and Technology High School in Ususan, Taguig National High School, a state-owned secondary institution in New Lower Bicutan, the Catholic Church-owned Colegio de Santa Ana (formerly Santa Ana Parochial School), The Fisher Valley College, a Christian school in Hagonoy and Pinagsama and Saint Francis of Assisi College System, a Catholic school in Bagumbayan.

Taguig is set to become the new "university city" of Metro Manila as new campuses of University of the Philippines Professional Schools and De La Salle University are located in Bonifacio Global City.

Notable personalities

Dante Tiñga, former Associate Justice of the Supreme Court
Daryl Borja Ruiz, also known as Skusta Clee, ExB rapper, singer-songwriter
Rene Cayetano, former Senator
Felix Y. Manalo, Iglesia Ni Cristo Preacher
Lino Cayetano, TV/movie director, former Congressman, Mayor
Jamalul Kiram III, claimant to throne of Sultanate of Sulu
Ervic Vijandre, actor
Precious Lara Quigaman, actress and Miss International 2005 titleholder 
Lance Lucido, Filipino child actor
Rene Facunla Humpshire a.k.a. Ate Glow, Filipino Actor/Commediane/Impersonator 
Lucita Soriano, actress
Laureana Franco, humanitarian, catechist and sainthood candidate

Groups
Taguig Renegade Drum and Lyre Corps, 3-time National Drum and Lyre champion

International relations

Diplomatic missions
Countries that have set up permanent missions or offices in the city include:

Sister cities
The local government of Taguig maintains relations with other cities in the Philippines.

Notes

References

External links

Official Website of Taguig City
 [ Philippine Standard Geographic Code]
Think Big Taguig - Official Lifestyle Website
Official Facebook page of City of Taguig
Taguig City General Information

 
Cities in Metro Manila
Populated places established in 1587
1587 establishments in the Philippines
Populated places on the Pasig River
Populated places on Laguna de Bay
Highly urbanized cities in the Philippines